The following is a timeline of the history of the city of Southampton, Hampshire, England.

Pre-16th century 

 750 – The Market is active.
 837 – The Town is besieged by Danes, who then 'ravage' it in around 980.
 10th C. - Origins of the Southampton town walls.
 11th C. – Southampton Castle is built.
 1070 – St. Michael's Church is founded.
 1086 - The town becomes a Royal Borough.
 1124 – St Denys Priory is founded by Henry I.
 1180 – This is the approximate date that Bargate is built.
 1189 - Richard I. "freed the burgesses from tolls and all secular customs".
 1197 – This is the approximate date that the Church of St. Julien is established.
 1200 – This is the approximate date that the Long House is built.
 1220 – This is the approximate date that Walter Fortin becomes the mayor.
 1233 – This is the approximate date that the Franciscan Friary is founded.
 1236 – Jews expelled.
 1239 – Netley Abbey is founded near the town.
 1256 - Henry III "granted all the liberties and customs enjoyed by Winchester".
 1299 – Bowling Green is in use.
 late 13th C. - God's House Tower starts operating as a gatehouse into the old town.
 1300 – Southampton's population is approximately 5,000.
 1319 – The Venetian state fleet visits Southampton.
 1320 – Holyrood Church is built.
 1332 - The Dancing Man Brewery is founded in The Wool House.
 1338 – The town is taken by French forces.
 1348 – The Black Plague strikes.
 1415 – August: The ringleaders of the Southampton Plot are executed at Bargate.
 1445 - The charter of incorporation is given by Henry VI.
 1461 – Southampton fair is active.
 1491 - The Tudor House and Garden is built.

16th to 18th centuries 
 1552 – King Edward VI visits the town.
 1553 - King Edward VI School ia founded.
 1554 – King Philip II of Spain visits the town.
 1640 - The charter "was finally given" by Charles I.
 1669 – King Charles II visits the town.
 1760 – Taunton's School is founded.
 1761 – The Assembly rooms are built.
 1766 – The Theatre Royal is built.
 1772 – The Hampshire Chronicle newspaper begins publication.
 1795 - All Saints' Church is completed.
 1798 – Thorners Charity is built.
 1799 – The Northam Bridge is built.

19th century 
 1802 – The Salisbury and Southampton Canal begins operating.
 1822 – The Southampton County Chronicle newspaper begins publication.
 1823
 The Public dispensary is established.
 The Hampshire Advertiser newspaper is established and circulates until 1900 from an earlier publication, the Herald.
 1830 – The Southampton Polytechnic Institution is established.
 1831 – Southampton's population is 19,324.
 1832 - 8 July: The London and South Western Railway begins as the London and Southampton Railway 
 1833 - The Royal Pier opens, but it's closed by 1979 before becoming derelict. The gatehouse is now a Grade II listed building.
 1835
 The Municipal Reform Act of 1835 abolishes Southampton's jurisdiction of Portsmouth's port.
 The Royal South Hants Hospital is formed.
 1836
 The Woolston Floating Bridge (ferry) begins operating.
 The Police force is established.
 The Southampton Dock Company is incorporated.
 1839 – Southampton Terminus railway station opens.
 1841
 The Ordnance Survey arrives in the town.
 Southampton's population is 27,744.
 1842
 The Docks are built.
 The builders merchant Elliott Brothers is in business.
 1846 – Southampton Old Cemetery begins operating.
 1847 – The Riding School at Carlton Place is completed.
 1849 – The bookseller James & Co. is in business.
 1855 – Southampton School of Art, and the prison on Ascupart Street are established.
 1856 - Netley Hospital, a.k.a. Royal Victoria Hospital, opens.
 1860 – The Southampton Times newspaper begins publication.
 1861 - 10 September: Red Funnel ferries start operating ferry services between Southampton and Cowes on the Isle of Wight.
 1862 – The Hartley Institute is founded.
 1872 – The Ordnance Survey buildings are constructed.
 1874 - The Hythe Pier, Hythe & Southampton Ferry company is formed, with a ferry service starting from Southampton in 1880 after the pier is completed.
 1875
 The Watts Memorial Hall is built.
 The Royal Southampton Yacht Club is chartered.
 1876 – Above Bar Church is founded.
 1879 – The Southampton Tramways Company begins operating.
 1884 – St. Mary's Church is built.
 1885 – St. Mary's Young Men's Association Football Club, and the Hampshire Field Club are established.
 1889
 Southampton Free Public Library is established.
 St Mary's Road drill hall is completed.
 1890 – September: The Southampton Dock Strike of 1890 takes place.
 1891
 The Didcot, Newbury and Southampton Railway begins operating.
 Southampton Docks is acquired by the London and South Western Railway company.
 1895
 Bitterne (portion), Freemantle, Millbrook, and Shirley become part of Southampton.
 Southampton West railway station opens.
 1898
 Southampton Football Club is founded.
 The Dell (stadium) opens.
 1899 – The bookseller David Holmes is in business.

20th century 
 1900 - Southampton General Hospital is founded as the Southampton Union Infirmary.
 1901 – Southampton's population is 104,824.
 1902 - Warsash Maritime School opens on Newtown Road, with its current campus in St Mary's opening in 2017.
 1905 – Southampton Record Society is founded.
 1907 – White Star Line relocates to Southampton from Liverpool.
 1908 - Southampton Water serves as one of the sailing and motorboating venues for the 1908 Summer Olympics.
 1912
 The Tudor House Museum is established.
 10 April: The  departs Southampton on her maiden and final voyage; later sinks on 14 April.
 1913 – The Palladium Cinema opens.
 1914
 The Scala Cinema opens.
 22 April: The Titanic Engineers' Memorial is unveiled in East Park to commemorate the engineers who lost their lives on the RMS Titanic 2 years prior.
 4 August: From this date, Southampton's docks are used to take soldiers over to France following the outbreak of World War I.
 1919
 January: The 1919 Southampton Mutiny takes place.
 Cunard Line relocates to Southampton from Liverpool.
 1920
 Bassett, Bitterne Parish Council, Itchen Urban District Council, and Swaythling become part of Southampton.
 The Cenotaph (war memorial) is unveiled in Watts Park.
 1925 – The Southampton Above Bar Musical and Dramatic Society osactive.
 1928 – The Empire Theatre opens.
 1932 – Southampton Municipal Airport is established.
 1933 – King George V Graving Dock opens.
 1937
 Southampton Guildhall opens.
 The company Foster, Wikner Aircraft relocates to Southampton.
 1939 – Southampton City Art Gallery opens.
 1940 – November–December: There's aerial bombing by German forces.
 1947 - 14 April: The  runs aground on a sandbank just outside of Southampton.
 By the 1950s - Mayflower Park is laid out.
 1952 – The University of Southampton is chartered.
 1954 – The Northam Bridge is rebuilt.
 1961 – The Museum of Archaeology opens in God's House Tower.
 1962 – The City of Southampton Society founded, and then Southampton becomes a city in 1964.
 1965 – Wilton Royal factory opens near city.
 1966 – Southampton Maritime Museum opens in The Wool House.
 1968 – The Southampton Boat Show begins.
 1969
 Southampton Technical College is established.
 Television Centre is built, and it then closes in 2008.
 1976
 Griffon Hoverwork Ltd is founded under the names Griffon Hovercraft and Hoverwork Ltd, with the current name being used since 2008.
 Summer: Southampton has the hottest June day ever recorded during the heatwave this year, where it reaches 35.6°C (96.1°F).
 1977 - The Woolston Floating Bridge (ferry) stops operating, with the Itchen Bridge opening in July of the same year.
 1979 – The John Hansard Gallery is established.
 1984
 Southampton Institute of Higher Education is established as a merger of Southampton College of Art. It then merges with the Southampton College of Technology, and later the College of Nautical Studies at Warsash.
 The aviation museum Solent Sky opens.
 1985 – The Medieval Merchant's House is restored.
 1986
 The Ocean Village (marina) area is redeveloped. The latest of these developments, the Ocean Village Harbour Hotel, is completed in October 2017.
 Southampton Citybus is in operation.
 1989 – Bargate Shopping Centre is built.
 1991 – The Marlands Shopping Centre is in business.
 1995 - The M3 motorway opens, forming an artery between the South Coast, Isle of Wight and London.
 1996 – The Southampton Oceanography Centre opens.

21st century 
 2000
 28 September: WestQuay shopping centre is in business.
 The Chamberlayne Leisure Centre opens in Mayfield Park.
 2001 – Southampton's population is 217,400.
 2005 - Southampton Solent is given University status, which includes Southampton College of Art, the Southampton College of Technology, and later the College of Nautical Studies from its previous merger as the Southampton Institute of Higher Education in 1984.
 2009 – The Carnival House office building opens.
 2011 – Southampton's population is 236,900.
 2012
 10 April: Southampton commemorates the 100th anniversary of the sinking of the RMS Titanic with ships sounding their horns at 12 pm and a memorial service.
The SeaCity Museum opens.
 2013 - Bargate Shopping Centre closes, and its demolition begins on 24 November 2017.
 2015 - 3 January: The Ro-Ro car carrier Hoegh Osaka became stranded on a sandbank outside of Southampton Water after developing a major list from an unstable load of cars. She was eventually refloated on 22 January, and all of her 24 crew survivied with minimal injuries.
 2016 - WestQuay Watermark opens.
 2017 - Warsash Maritime School relocates to its current campus in St Mary's as part of Solent University's major redevelopment work, which is opened by HRH Anne, Princess Royal. The STCW training centre in Warsash village remains part of the university, the former teaching and accommodation facilities are set to be converted into flats, and the simulation centre on the main university campus has major upgrade work. All of this is completed by 2019.
 2019 - Between 17 and 19 May, the South Coast Boat Show holds its first event in Ocean Village.
 2020
 23 March: Southampton goes into a nationwide lockdown with the rest of the UK due to the COVID-19 pandemic.
 5 November: Southampton joins the rest of the UK in a nationwide lockdown that lasts until 2 December in an attempt to reduce the number of cases.
 20 December: Southampton moves to Tier 4 restriction after being in Tier 3 restrictions since 2 December.
 2021
 4 January: The Prime Minister Boris Johnson announces that Southampton, along with the rest of the UK, will go into another nationwide lockdown to control the new variants of COVID-19 from 6 January, which will last at least until the Spring. Then on 22 February, he announces plans to bring the UK, including Southampton, cautiously out of lockdown, with plans for restrictions to be fully lifted by 21 June.
 16 May: The P&O cruise ship 'Iona' is christened in Southampton by Dame Irene Hays, with her maiden voyage taking place on 7 August to Scotland and the Channel Isles.
 14 June: Plans to end COVID-19 restrictions are delayed by 4 weeks to 19 July due to a sharp rise of the Delta variant.
 19 July: COVID-19 restrictions in England, including Southampton, come to an end after Prime Minister Boris Johnson confirms this on 12 July.
 September: Southampton secures its place in its bid to become the City Of Culture in 2025.
 9 November: Southampton Airport is named as the best in the UK and the third best globally for sustainability performance as part of COP26 in Glasgow.
 8 December: Prime Minister Boris Johnson announces plan B of COVID-19 restrictions due to a sharp increase of the Omicron variant.
 Southampton's population is 261,729.
 2022
 26 January: Plan B measures for COVID-19 restrictions across the UK, including Southampton, come to an end after Prime Minister Boris Johnson announces this on 19 January following a decline in the Omicron variant.
 18 February: Red Funnel's 'Red Falcon' crashes into Southampton's ferry terminal as a result of Storm Eunice, but she only sustains light damage to her hull near the bow.
 24 February: Prime Minister Boris Johnson removes the last of the COVID-19 restrictions (compulsory isolation with a positive test) in Southampton and the rest of the UK.
 4 March: AIDAcosma, which is owned by AIDA Cruises, makes her maiden voyage from Southampton.
 9 March: Solent Sky is given permission to built its £5,000,000 extension to house more aircraft and other attractions.
 21 March: Southampton is announced as one of the 4 cities to be shortlisted to be the City Of Culture in 2025 alongside Bradford, County Durham and Wrexham County, but loses to Bradford on 31 May.
 2 July: Plans for a new underground link between Southampton's and Netley's railway lines are announced. If approved, this would link Southampton Central station and the Netley line to provide a more direct and faster route to Portsmouth at a cost of £45 billion.
 27 July: Red Funnel's staff go on strike over their pay, affecting evening services.
 12 August: A drought is officially declared in the south of England, including Southampton, during the second heatwave of this year.
 1 November: It's announced that Celebrity Apex of Celebrity Cruises is to homeport in Southampton.
 6 November: Carnival Celebration of Carnival Cruise Line arrives in Southampton on her maiden voyage.
 8 November: An 'Operational incident' is declared at the nearby Fawley Refinery, causing an orange glow to be seen up to 25 miles away across Hampshire and the South Coast and with flares being seen in Southampton.
 29 November: First Bus South end all bus services in Southampton, with Bluestar taking over their routes.
 18 December: P&O Cruises' newest ship Arvia arrives in Southampton for her inaugural voyage on 23 December.
 December: Royal Mail strikes affect Southampton's Christmas post.
 Southampton's railway services are affected during the National Union of Rail, Maritime and Transport Workers (RMT) and ASLEF rail strikes throughout this year and into early 2023
 2023
 6 January: The Southampton based cruise ship Arvia arrives in Barbados for her naming ceremony.
 13 February: Improvement works to Southampton Central station begins, with the forecourt expected to be completed by July this year.
 Southampton's mainline railway services continue to be affected during the National Union of Rail, Maritime and Transport Workers (RMT) rail strikes continue into this year.

See also 
 History of Southampton
 Timelines of other cities in South East England: Oxford, Portsmouth, Reading

References

Further reading

Published in the 18th century

Published in the 19th century

1800s-1840s

1850s-1890s

Published in the 20th century

External links 

 
 
 
 . Includes Southampton area directories, various dates.

Years in England
 
Southampton-related lists
Southampton
Southampton